Sanaag University is a public university in (Ceerigaabo) the capital City of Sanaag region the eastern edge of Somaliland.

Undergraduate programs
Established in 2009, the college offers undergraduate courses in various fields. Among these disciplines are:

Faculty of Agriculture and Animal science
Faculty of Business Administration
Accounting and finance
Management
Human Resource Management 
Faculty of Law
Faculty of ICT
Faculty of Health Science 
Nursing 
Midwifery
Nutrition
Laboratory
Dentistry
Faculty of education
Faculty of Engineering
Civil engineering

Admission
Original secondary school certificate 
Passing written and oral entrance exam

Faculties
Faculty of Agriculture and Environmental Science
Faculty of Education
Faculty of Language & Skills
Faculty of Engineering
Faculty of Business Administration
Faculty of Law
Faculty of Health Science

References

Universities in Somaliland
2009 establishments in Somaliland
Educational institutions established in 2009
Sanaag